Lidiia Soloviova (born 21 January 1978) is a Ukrainian disability powerlifter, who has represented Ukraine at the 2000, 2004, 2008, 2012 and 2016 Summer Paralympics.

She qualified for the 2016 Summer Paralympics who took the gold medal after lifting 107 kg in the Powerlifting Women's 50 kg ⋅category. Her competitors included Zuray Marcano who was one of the oldest Olympians as she was aged 62. 

She won the bronze medal in the women's 50 kg event at the 2021 World Para Powerlifting Championships held in Tbilisi, Georgia.

References

External links
 National Sports Committee for the Disabled of Ukraine  

1987 births
Living people
Sportspeople from Dnipro
Paralympic powerlifters of Ukraine
Paralympic gold medalists for Ukraine
Paralympic silver medalists for Ukraine
Paralympic bronze medalists for Ukraine
Paralympic medalists in powerlifting
Medalists at the 2000 Summer Paralympics
Medalists at the 2004 Summer Paralympics
Medalists at the 2008 Summer Paralympics
Medalists at the 2012 Summer Paralympics
Medalists at the 2016 Summer Paralympics
Powerlifters at the 2000 Summer Paralympics
Powerlifters at the 2004 Summer Paralympics
Powerlifters at the 2008 Summer Paralympics
Powerlifters at the 2012 Summer Paralympics
Powerlifters at the 2016 Summer Paralympics
Powerlifters at the 2020 Summer Paralympics
21st-century Ukrainian women